Kristine Johnson (born June 5, 1972, in Angeles City, Philippines), is a co-anchor at WCBS-TV in New York City on the 5 p.m. and 11 p.m. newscasts with Maurice DuBois.

Early life and education
Johnson was born in the Philippines, the daughter of a Filipina mother and a Swedish American father. Johnson graduated from the University of Nebraska with a Bachelor of Arts in journalism and minors in political science, history and English.

Career
Johnson started her career as a reporter and anchor in Providence, Rhode Island for WPRI. She joined NBC in 2005, working as an anchor of NBC's Early Today and First Look on MSNBC. She was also one of the alternating news anchors on NBC's Weekend Today. She announced on Early Today that October 20, 2006, was her last day and that she would be moving on. That was the same week that NBC Universal announced that it would cut 700 jobs.

She joined WCBS-TV in November 2006 as co-anchor of the noon and 5 p.m. newscasts alongside Chris Wragge, the station's former sports director. In June 2007, she and Wragge replaced Dana Tyler and Jim Rosenfield on the 11 p.m. newscast, with Tyler and Rosenfield taking the noon newscast. She anchored the news during Hurricane Sandy, the blizzard of 2013, the Sandy Hook Elementary School shooting, and Boston Marathon bombing. In September 2022, Johnson traveled to London to cover preparations for the funeral of Elizabeth II.

She is the recipient of two nominations for an Emmy award as a producer.

Personal life
Johnson resides in Upper Saddle River, New Jersey with her husband Steve, daughter Ava (born May 2002), and son Burke (born March 2007).

Johnson has run and completed three New York City Marathons in 2014, 2015, and 2021.

See also
 Filipinos in the New York City metropolitan region

References

External links
Kristine Johnson Biography at wcbstv.com

 Filipino emigrants to the United States
 University of Nebraska–Lincoln alumni
 American people of Swedish descent
 American women journalists
 American writers of Filipino descent
 People from Angeles City
 People from Upper Saddle River, New Jersey
 Television anchors from New York City
 Living people
 1972 births
 CBS News people
 NBC News people
 MSNBC people
 21st-century American women